Break Up the Concrete is the ninth studio album by rock group The Pretenders. It is their first studio album since Loose Screw in 2002. Several "exclusive" editions of the disc exist (see track listing below); each appends a new countrified version of a vintage Pretenders song, in keeping with the general sound of the album. The title song "Break Up the Concrete" was used in the opening scene of an episode of House M.D. ("5 to 9", season 6, episode 14).

The first edition of Break Up the Concrete also includes a small sheet of "handmade seed paper", which can be planted, and if cared for, promise to sprout within a few weeks. The cover art parodies the sleeve of fellow power-popper Joe Jackson's 1979 debut Look Sharp!

Break Up the Concrete was the first Pretenders album since 1994's Last of the Independents not to feature Martin Chambers on drums. In an interview, Chrissie Hynde said that she was looking for a different style, one she did not believe Chambers was capable of playing to her satisfaction. Session drummer Jim Keltner took his place in the studio, although Chambers would return for the tour in support of the album.

There were conflicting reports about Chambers' temporary ouster. Hynde claims that Keltner was actually recommended by Chambers and that he was fully aware of his replacement. Chambers, however, claimed in an interview that Hynde had not told him about being replaced by Keltner; in fact, he was unaware that an album was even being made until after the sessions were well underway. In a 2016 interview, Chambers said that he gave Hynde his blessing to record the album without him, citing his reluctance to record and Hynde's reluctance to compromise on songwriting and production.

Reception

The album has a score of 74 out of 100 from Metacritic based on "generally favorable reviews". Mojo gave the album four stars out of five and said that it was "looser and more organic, and a different sonic palette for Hynde." Q also gave it four stars out of five and said, "It's Hynde who steals the show with her lip-curling vibrato, part Elvis, part Dusty, never more intoxicating than on the seductive 'Almost Perfect.'" The Boston Globe gave it a positive review and said that the album "just might be [Hynde's] most congenial, and certainly rootsiest, collection yet."

Other reviews are average or mixed: Under the Radar gave the album six stars out of ten and said it had "a few throwaway tunes", but that it was "probably the best Pretenders album since Get Close." Uncut gave it three stars out of five and said that the album might be "a bargain... but the triumphs of yore tend to expose the new album's low-fi rockabilly and country strums." The Observer also gave it three stars out of five and said that Chrissie Hynde was "reinvestigating her roots with some rockabilly and a Dylan vibe." The Austin Chronicle, however, gave it two-and-a-half stars out of five and asked, "Why not take the five really good tracks... and offer a stellar EP for download?"

Track listing

UK and Brazilian versions track listing

Disc one – The Best of Pretenders

Disc two – Break Up the Concrete

Personnel
Chrissie Hynde – rhythm guitar, vocals
Eric Heywood – pedal steel guitar, background vocals
James Walbourne – guitar, piano, accordion, background vocals
Nick Wilkinson – bass guitar, background vocals
Jim Keltner – drums, background vocals

Charts

Break Up the Concrete debuted at number 32 on Billboard's album chart in the issue dated 25 October 2008 and it stayed on the chart for three weeks. The album was issued with a 'best of' in a double-disc edition in the UK and charted at number 35 on the UK Albums Chart.

Certifications

References

External links
 

The Pretenders albums
2008 albums
Shangri-La Music albums